"An Unfinished Race" is a short story by American Civil War soldier, wit, and writer Ambrose Bierce. The story, dealing with a mysterious disappearance of a man, was first published in The San Francisco Examiner on October 14, 1888, and was included in Bierce's collection Can Such Things Be? (1893). Bierce himself mysteriously disappeared in October 1914.

"An Unfinished Race" was collected in the third volume of Bierce's complete works, which included the ghost stories from his earlier book Can Such Things Be? The updated version included three new stories under the heading "Mysterious Disappearances", including "The Unfinished Race".

Summary
The three-paragraph story is set in 1873. He started to run, accompanied by the unnamed receiver of the bet, a linen draper named Barham Wise and a photographer named Hamerson Burns, who followed him in a wagon. During the run, Worson stumbled and fell, "with a terrible cry", and vanished before he hit the ground. He was never seen again. The witnesses were suspects for a time but were freed later that day with Worson never being found.

References
the shoe maker 
Died

External links

Direct link to the page of the book covering the James Worson incident
 

Short stories by Ambrose Bierce
1888 short stories
Fiction set in 1873
Warwickshire in fiction